Paul Gerrard Peter Roebuck (born 13 October 1963) is a former English cricketer. Roebuck was a right-handed batsman who bowled right-arm medium-fast. He was born at Bath, Somerset, and was educated at Millfield School.

While studying at the University of Cambridge, Roebuck made his first-class debut for Cambridge University against Glamorgan at Fenner's in 1983. He made four further first-class appearances for the university in 1983, before making a further five appearances in 1984. It was in 1984 that he made his only first-class appearance for Gloucestershire against Middlesex in the County Championship at the County Ground, Bristol. The following season, Roebuck made nine first-class appearances for Cambridge University, the last of which came against Oxford University in The University Match at Lord's. In nineteen first-class matches for the university, he scored a total of 686 runs at an average of 28.58, with a high score of 82. One of three half centuries he made, this score came against Somerset (captained by his brother, Peter) in 1985. With the ball, he took 6 wickets at a bowling average of 44.83, with best figures of 2/44.

While playing for the university, he also played List A cricket for the Combined Universities, making his debut in that format against Kent in the 1983 Benson & Hedges Cup. He made six further appearances for the team, the last of which came against Sussex in the 1985 Benson & Hedges Cup. In his seven List A matches, he scored a total of 132 runs at an average of 22.00, with a high score of 33.

He later made two first-class appearances for Glamorgan in the 1988 County Championship against Hampshire and Worcestershire, scoring a total of 60 runs.

References

External links

1963 births
Living people
Sportspeople from Bath, Somerset
People educated at Millfield
Alumni of the University of Cambridge
English cricketers
Cambridge University cricketers
British Universities cricketers
Gloucestershire cricketers
Glamorgan cricketers